Rineloricaria hasemani is a species of catfish in the family Loricariidae. It is native to South America, where it occurs in the lower Amazon River drainage basin, including the basin of Tocantins River, in Brazil. The species reaches 19.8 cm (7.8 inches) in standard length and is believed to be a facultative air-breather.

Rineloricaria hasemani appears in the aquarium trade, where it is typically referred to as Haseman's whip-tailed catfish.

References 

Loricariini
Fish described in 1979
Catfish of South America
Fish of the Amazon basin
Fish of Brazil